Isaac Marion Davis (June 14, 1895 – April 2, 1984) was a Major League Baseball shortstop.

Davis played all or part of three seasons in the majors:  for the Washington Senators, and - for the Chicago White Sox. He was the White Sox' starting shortstop in 1925, playing in 146 games and batting .240, but did he not play in the majors again. He was shipped to the Portland Beavers prior to the 1928 season as part of a trade for Bill Cissell.

External links

Major League Baseball shortstops
Washington Senators (1901–1960) players
Chicago White Sox players
Wichita Witches players
Minneapolis Millers (baseball) players
Toronto Maple Leafs (International League) players
Columbus Senators players
Seattle Indians players
Portland Beavers players
Baseball players from Colorado
1895 births
1984 deaths